A Cuneiform fracture is an injury of the foot in which one or more of the Cuneiform bones are fractured.

Causes
While cuneiform fractures are fairly rare, the most commonly fractured cuneiform bone is the Medial cuneiform, typically the cause for a cuneiform fracture is by physical trauma (direct blow) to the cuneiform, as well as the result of an avulsion fracture and a result of axial load, but can also be the result of a stress reaction that progressed with continued weight-bearing and physical activity.

References 

Injuries of ankle and foot
Bone fractures